Satyrium hyrcanicum, the Hyrcanian hairstreak, is a butterfly in the family Lycaenidae.

Distribution
The range of this species is limited to mountainous areas in northeast Turkey.

Satyrium (butterfly)
Butterflies described in 1939